Ellis County is a county located on the western border of the U.S. state of Oklahoma. As of the 2010 census, the population was 4,151, making it the fifth-least populous county in Oklahoma. Its county seat is Arnett.

The county was named for Albert H. Ellis, vice president of the 1906 Constitutional Convention.

History
This area was used by indigenous tribes that included the Comanche, Kiowa, Apache, Cheyenne, and Arapaho. In 1820, an expedition led by Stephen Long passed through the area while exploring the Canadian River all the way to Fort Smith, Arkansas. Conflicts broke out between the Native Americans and the white settlers that were rapidly moving into Texas. In May 1858, the governor of Texas sent a force of Texas Rangers, militia and allied Indians (notably the Tonkawas), led by Captain John S. "Rip" Ford into Indian Territory. Ford's command fought a battle known as either the Battle of Little Robe Creek or the Battle of Antelope Hills inside the present Ellis County. The battle was notable because it resulted in killing the Comanche chief, Iron Jacket, father of Peta Nocona and grandfather of Quanah Parker.

After the Civil War, roads and railroads turned the Ellis County area into a transportation corridor. A military road connected Fort Supply (Oklahoma) with Fort Elliott. During the 1880s, the Western Trail, a cattle trail between Texas and Kansas, intersected the military road near the present town of Fargo. The Southern Kansas Railway, later owned by the Atchison, Topeka and Santa Fe Railway, built a line in 1886-7 from Kiowa, Kansas that resulted in starting three Ellis County towns: Fargo, Gage, and Shattuck.

When Oklahoma Territory was created, the present Ellis County became part of Day County. After statehood, several county boundaries changed and resulted in the elimination of Day County. The northern part became Roger Mills County, while the southwestern part of Woodward County was added to the remainder of Day County to become Ellis County. An election for location of the county seat in June 1908, resulted in a runoff between the towns of Shattuck and Arnett. The latter won the runoff election and remains the county seat.

On April 9, 1947, an F5 tornado, the sixth deadliest ever recorded in the United States, tore through Ellis County. The damage occurred mostly in rural areas, and the towns were largely spared. The storm killed six people in Ellis county itself.

Geography
The county is mostly within the Great Plains physiographic region.

The major stream is Wolf Creek, a tributary of the North Canadian River. Other waterways are Little Robe, Commission and Hackberry Creeks, tributaries of the Canadian River, which forms the southern boundary of the county. The Ellis County Wildlife Management Area, with Lake Lloyd Vincent, are in the southwestern corner of the county. Packsaddle Wildlife Management Area is in the south central part of the county, along the Canadian River.

Major highways

  U.S. Highway 60
  U.S. Highway 270
  U.S. Highway 283
  U.S. Highway 412
  State Highway 3
  State Highway 15
  State Highway 46
  State Highway 51

Adjacent counties
 Harper County (north)
 Woodward County (east)
 Dewey County (southeast)
 Roger Mills County (south)
 Hemphill County, Texas (southwest)
 Lipscomb County, Texas (west)
 Beaver County (northwest)

Demographics

As of the census of 2000, there were 4,075 people, 1,769 households, and 1,218 families residing in the county.  The population density was 3 people per square mile (1/km2).  There were 2,146 housing units at an average density of 2 per square mile (1/km2).  The racial makeup of the county was 96.29% White, 0.05% Black or African American, 1.20% Native American, 0.10% Asian, 0.74% from other races, and 1.62% from two or more races.  2.60% of the population were Hispanic or Latino of any race. 96.6% spoke English, 2.0% Spanish and 1.4% German as their first language.

There were 1,769 households, out of which 25.30% had children under the age of 18 living with them, 59.90% were married couples living together, 6.00% had a female householder with no husband present, and 31.10% were non-families. 29.20% of all households were made up of individuals, and 15.70% had someone living alone who was 65 years of age or older.  The average household size was 2.27 and the average family size was 2.79.

In the county, the population was spread out, with 21.80% under the age of 18, 6.00% from 18 to 24, 21.60% from 25 to 44, 28.60% from 45 to 64, and 22.00% who were 65 years of age or older.  The median age was 45 years. For every 100 females there were 97.70 males.  For every 100 females age 18 and over, there were 95.10 males.

The median income for a household in the county was $27,951, and the median income for a family was $33,750. Males had a median income of $27,237 versus $17,772 for females. The per capita income for the county was $16,472.  About 9.20% of families and 12.50% of the population were below the poverty line, including 19.50% of those under age 18 and 10.00% of those age 65 or over.

Politics

Economy
From the time of its founding, the economy of Ellis County has been based on farming and ranching. The most important crops have been wheat, cotton and broomcorn. In 1907, the town of Shattuck shipped more broomcorn than any other shipping point in the nation. Cattle raising had become important right after the Civil War. A major player locally was the Dominion Cattle Company, part of the Cherokee Strip Livestock Association. Although grazing leases ended with the land run, ranching and cattle feeding remained important. In the 1970s, dairying proved profitable.

Education
Gage Public Schools are located in Ellis County. The Gage Public School website is http://www.gage.k12.ok.us

Recreation
The  Ellis County WMA provides public wildlife and hunting opportunities. In 1961 the Oklahoma Department of Wildlife Conservation created the  Lake Lloyd Vincent by impounding Coon Creek in the WMA for boating, fishing, and swimming recreation.

Communities
 Arnett (county seat)
 Catesby
 Fargo
 Gage
 Harmon
 Shattuck

See also
 National Register of Historic Places listings in Ellis County, Oklahoma

References

External links
  Encyclopedia of Oklahoma History and Culture - Ellis County
 Oklahoma Digital Maps: Digital Collections of Oklahoma and Indian Territory

 
1907 establishments in Oklahoma
Populated places established in 1907